Sebastian Hauck (born December 20, 1988) is a German retired footballer.

References

External links

1988 births
Living people
FC Rot-Weiß Erfurt players
RB Leipzig players
FC Sachsen Leipzig players
VfB Lübeck players
3. Liga players
FC Amberg players
German footballers
Association football forwards
Footballers from Leipzig